This article presents in a tabular form the career tennis Grand Slam, World Hard Court Championships and Olympic singles results of every woman who has reached the singles final of at least one Grand Slam, World Hard Court Championships or Olympic tournament (OLY) during her career.  The Grand Slam tournaments are the Australian Open (AUS), the French Open (FRA), Wimbledon (WIM), and the US Open (USA).

This article is a compilation of the performance timelines that are included in the numerous Wikipedia articles covering individual tennis players, such as Helen Wills Moody, Billie Jean King, Margaret Court, Chris Evert, Martina Navratilova, and Steffi Graf.  This article facilitates the comparison of the career Grand Slam, World Hard Court Championships and Olympic singles results of each player, particularly of women who were playing at the same time.

This article is split into two sections, 1884–1977 and 1978–present, for ease of navigation.

Key to table entries 

The loser in the bronze medal match receives the normal semifinal entry shown above. The rest of the Olympic entries follow the standard key based on their progression through the tournament.

Refer to the notes below each table for an explanation of more tabular entries that are used infrequently in these tables.

1884–1977

1978–1984
Winner of most titles: Martina Navratilova, with 11

1985–1991
Winner of most titles: Steffi Graf, with 10

Notes
In 1986, the Australian Open was not held due to the moving of the date from December to January.

1992–1998
Winner of most titles: Steffi Graf, with 11

Notes:

At the 1992 Olympics, no bronze medal match was played and thus both of the semifinalists received the bronze medal.

1999–2005
Winner of most titles: Serena Williams, with 7

2006–2012
Winner of most titles: Serena Williams, with 8

2013–2019
Winner of most titles: Serena Williams, with 8

2020–2026
Winner of most titles: Iga Świątek with 3

See also

Tennis performance timeline comparison (men)

References

Women's tennis
p